Jane Goes A-Wooing is a lost 1919 American silent society drama film produced by Famous Players-Lasky and distributed by Paramount Pictures. George Melford directed Vivian Martin in this drama.

Plot
Based upon a review in a film magazine, Jane Neill (Martin) goes to work for irritable old dramatist David Lyman (Aitken), who is annoyed by the extravagance of his spendthrift nephew Monty Lyman (Welch). Monty throws a ball at his uncle's home while Jane is there at work, and she sees him under favorable circumstances and comes to idealize him. When the playwright dies, Jane discovers that he has left his vast property to her because of her assistance in his last great work. Believing through her infatuated eyes that Monty is the rightful heir, she sets out to reform him before turning over the property to him.

Cast
Vivian Martin as Jane Neill
Niles Welch as Monty Lyman
Casson Ferguson as Micky Donovan
Spottiswoode Aitken as David Lyman
Helen Dunbar as Mrs. Arliss
Bernardine Zuber as Nita Arliss
Clyde Benson as Harmon
Ella McKenzie as A  McKenzie Twin
Ida Mae McKenzie as A McKenzie Twin
Frank Hayes as Wicks
Lila Lee

References

External links

Lantern slide advertisement for the theaters (Wayback Machine)

1919 films
Lost American films
Films directed by George Melford
Paramount Pictures films
Films based on short fiction
1919 drama films
American silent feature films
Silent American drama films
American black-and-white films
1919 lost films
Lost drama films
1910s American films